The Diary of a Chambermaid (French: Le Journal d'une femme de chambre) is a 1900 decadent novel by Octave Mirbeau, published during the Dreyfus Affair. 
First published in serialized form in L’Écho de Paris from 1891 to 1892, Mirbeau’s novel was reworked and polished before appearing in the Dreyfusard journal La Revue Blanche in 1900.

Plot 

The novel presents itself as the diary of Mademoiselle Célestine R., a chambermaid. Her first employer fetishizes her boots, and she later discovers the elderly man dead, with one of her boots stuffed into his mouth. Later on, Célestine becomes the maid of an upper class couple, Lanlaire, and is perfectly aware that she is entangled in the power struggles of their marriage. Célestine ends by becoming a café hostess, who mistreats her servants in turn.

Commentary 

As a libertarian writer, Octave Mirbeau gives voice to a maidservant, Célestine: that is already subversive in itself. Through her eyes, which perceive the world through keyholes, he shows us the foul-smelling hidden sides of high society, the ‘moral bumps’ of the dominating classes, and the turpitudes of the bourgeois society that he assails. Mirbeau’s story undresses the members of high society of their superficial probity, revealing them in the undergarments of their moral flaws: their hypocrisy and perversions.

Ending up in a Norman town at the home of the Lanlaires, with their grotesque family name, who owe their unjustifiable wealth to their respective ‘honourable’ parents’ swindlings, she evokes, as she recalls her memories, all the jobs that she has done for years in the swankiest households, and draws a conclusion that the reader is invited to make his own: «However vile the riff-raff may be, they are never as vile as decent people.» (« Si infâmes que soient les canailles, ils ne le sont jamais autant que les honnêtes gens. »)

Octave Mirbeau denounces domestic service as a modern form of slavery. However, he offers no sentimentalised image of the underclass, as servants exploited by their masters are ideologically alienated themselves: « D’être domestique, on a ça dans le sang... ».

With its fractured exposition, its temporal dislocations, its clashing styles, and varying forms, Mirbeau’s novel breaks with the conventions of the realistic novel and relinquishes all claims to documentary objectivity and narrative linearity.

Quotes 

 «For me, all crime – especially murder – has secret ties with love.»
 «The worship of money is the lowest of all human emotions, but it is shared not only by the bourgeoisie but also by the great majority of us… Little people, humble people, even those who are practically penniless. And I, with all my indignation, all my passion for destruction, I, too, am not free of it. I, who am oppressed by wealth, who realise it to be the source of all misery, all my vices and hatred, all the bitterest humiliations that I have to suffer, all my impossible dreams and all the endless torment of my existence, still, all the time, as soon as I find myself in the presence of a rich person, I cannot help looking up to him, as some exceptional and splendid being, a kind of marvelous divinity, and in spite of myself, stronger than either my will or my reason, I feel rising from the very depths of my being, a sort of incense of admiration for this wealthy creature, who is all too often as stupid as he is pitiless. Isn’t it crazy? And why... why?»

Adaptations

Film
The novel has been loosely adapted for cinema four times: 
1916, in Russia, by M. Martov, under the title Dnevnik gornitchnoi (Дневник горничной).
1946, an American film, The Diary of a Chambermaid, directed by Jean Renoir, starring Paulette Goddard.
1964, Le Journal d’une femme de chambre, by Luis Buñuel, in French, starring Jeanne Moreau, Georges Géret and Michel Piccoli.
2015, Journal d’une femme de chambre, by Benoît Jacquot, in French, starring Léa Seydoux and Vincent Lindon.

Stage
It was also made into a play by Andre Heuse, André de Lorde, and Thielly Nores. 
Plenty of theatrical adaptations have been made during the last 20 years, in French, but also in Italian, English, Spanish, Dutch and German.
In 2004, a new American theatrical adaptation of Diary of A Chambermaid produced by Antonia Fairchild and directed by Adrian Giurgea, had its world-premiere in New York City.

References

External links

The Book
  Octave Mirbeau, Le Journal d’une femme de chambre, Éditions du Boucher, 2003.
  Octave Mirbeau, Le Journal d’une femme de chambre, audio version 
  Octave Mirbeau, A Chambermaid’s Diary, Tucker, 1900.
  Octave Mirbeau, Celestine: The Diary of a Chambermaid, Olympia Press, 2008.

About The Book
  Pierre Michel,  .
  Serge Duret, « Le Journal d’ une femme de chambre, ou la redécouverte du modèle picaresque », Cahiers Octave Mirbeau, n° 2, 1995, p. 101-124.
  Anita Staron, « “La Servitude dans le sang” – L’Image de la domesticité dans l’œuvre d’Octave Mirbeau », in Statut et fonctions du domestique dans les littératures romanes, Lublin, Wydawnictwo UMCS, 2004, p. 129-140.
  Robert Ziegler, « Fetishist Art in Mirbeau’s Le Journal d’une femme de chambre », 2005.
  John Baxter, « « Everybody ought to have a maid », Foreword,  Harper Collins Publishers, 2007.
  Melanie Dante, « The Chambermaid – Mirbeau to Buñuel », Black Dahlia Creative, 2009.

 
Novels by Octave Mirbeau
French novels adapted into films
Fictional diaries
Picaresque novels
Novels first published in serial form
Works originally published in L'Écho de Paris
1900 French novels
French novels adapted into plays